The 1947 North Carolina Tar Heels football team was an American football team that represented the University of North Carolina at Chapel Hill in the Southern Conference during the 1947 college football season. In its fifth year under head coach Carl Snavely, the team compiled an 8–2 record (4–1 against conference opponents), finished in second place in the conference, was ranked No. 9 in the final AP Poll, and outscored opponents by a total of 210 to 93.

Three North Carolina players were selected by the Associated Press as first-team players on the 1947 All-Southern Conference football team: halfback Charlie Justice; end Art Weiner; and tackle Len Szafaryn. Justice, known as Charlie "Choo Choo" Justice, was a triple-threat man who was selected by a vote of the Southern Conference's 16 head coaches as the most valuable player in the conference during the 1947 season.

The team played its home games at Kenan Memorial Stadium in Chapel Hill, North Carolina.

Schedule

References

North Carolina
North Carolina Tar Heels football seasons
North Carolina Tar Heels football